Peter Philip Brodie  (22 October 1916 – 16 October 1996) was a Church of Scotland minister, most notably Moderator of the General Assembly of the Church of Scotland  from 1978  to 1979.

Life

He was born in Airdrie on 22 October 1916 the son of Robert and Margaret Brodie.

He was educated at Airdrie Academy; Glasgow University and Trinity College, Glasgow.

In 1940 he began as assistant to Rev Morrison at St Marys Church in Kirkintilloch. Following the death of Rev Morrison in 1941 he became minister, and served as such from 1942 to 1947. In the war he served in the Home Guard.

In 1947 he was transferred to St Mungo's Church in Alloa and ministered there until 1987.

In 1978 he succeeded Very Rev John Rodger Gray as Moderator of the General Assembly, the highest position within the Church of Scotland. He was succeeded in turn in 1979 by Very Rev Robert Barbour.

Family
He was married to Constance Lindsay Hope.

They were parents to Philip Brodie, Lord Brodie (b.1950).

Notes

1916 births
People educated at Airdrie Academy
Alumni of the University of Glasgow
20th-century Ministers of the Church of Scotland
Moderators of the General Assembly of the Church of Scotland
1996 deaths
British Home Guard soldiers